The British Maritime Charitable Foundation is a registered charity which promotes Britain’s interests across the maritime field, founded in 1981.  It informs public and parliamentary awareness of the importance of the nations maritime industries

According to its website, the charity
 Projects to support maritime training and education, to raise public awareness of the United Kingdom’s maritime heritage and its dependence on the sea.
 Help for young people to take up maritime careers and support for Sea Vision initiatives.
 Maritime Media Awards given annually to writers, broadcasters or media persons considered to have made the most constructive contribution to Britain’s maritime affairs.
 The Memorial Book kept in the Seafarers’ Chapel at All Hallows by the Tower records the names of those lost at sea with no known grave. The Annual Service of Thanksgiving for relatives and friends held annually in October.

Maritime media award 

In 2009, the Foundation's media award was given to actor Ross Kemp for his TV series "In Search of Pirates". Previous winners have included Libby Purves OBE, Richard Woodman, Dr Colin White and Professor Nicholas Rodger.

References

External links
British Maritime Charitable Foundation

Maritime organizations
1981 establishments in the United Kingdom
Organizations established in 1981
Charities based in London
Maritime history of the United Kingdom